In computer science, bogosort (also known as permutation sort, stupid sort, slowsort or bozosort) is a sorting algorithm based on the generate and test paradigm. The function successively generates permutations of its input until it finds one that is sorted. It is not considered useful for sorting, but may be used for educational purposes, to contrast it with more efficient algorithms.

Two versions of this algorithm exist: a deterministic version that enumerates all permutations until it hits a sorted one, and a randomized version that randomly permutes its input. An analogy for the working of the latter version is to sort a deck of cards by throwing the deck into the air, picking the cards up at random, and repeating the process until the deck is sorted. Its name is a portmanteau of the words bogus and sort.

Description of the algorithm
The following is a description of the randomized algorithm in pseudocode:

 while not sorted(deck):
     shuffle(deck)

Here is the above pseudocode rewritten in Python 3:

from random import shuffle

def is_sorted(data) -> bool:
    """Determine whether the data is sorted."""
    return all(a <= b for a, b in zip(data, data[1:]))

def bogosort(data) -> list:
    """Shuffle data until sorted."""
    while not is_sorted(data):
        shuffle(data)
    return data

This code assumes that  is a simple, mutable, array-like data structure—like Python's built-in —whose elements can be compared without issue.

Running time and termination

The expected number of swaps grows faster than the expected number of comparisons, because if the elements are not in order, this will usually be discovered after only a few comparisons, no matter how many elements there are; but the work of shuffling the collection is proportional to its size. In the worst case, the number of comparisons and swaps are both unbounded, for the same reason that a tossed coin might turn up heads any number of times in a row.

For any collection of fixed size, the expected running time of the algorithm is finite for much the same reason that the infinite monkey theorem holds: there is some probability of getting the right permutation, so given an unbounded number of tries it will almost surely eventually be chosen.

Related algorithms
 is a sorting algorithm introduced in the 2011 Google Code Jam. As long as the list is not in order, a subset of all elements is randomly permuted. If this subset is optimally chosen each time this is performed, the expected value of the total number of times this operation needs to be done is equal to the number of misplaced elements.
 is an algorithm that was designed not to succeed before the heat death of the universe on any sizable list. It works by recursively calling itself with smaller and smaller copies of the beginning of the list to see if they are sorted.  The base case is a single element, which is always sorted.  For other cases, it compares the last element to the maximum element from the previous elements in the list.  If the last element is greater or equal, it checks if the order of the copy matches the previous version, and if so returns.  Otherwise, it reshuffles the current copy of the list and restarts its recursive check.

 is another sorting algorithm based on random numbers. If the list is not in order, it picks two items at random and swaps them, then checks to see if the list is sorted. The running time analysis of a bozosort is more difficult, but some estimates are found in H. Gruber's analysis of "perversely awful" randomized sorting algorithms.  is found to be the expected average case.

 is a pessimal sorting algorithm that is guaranteed to complete in finite time; however, its efficiency can be arbitrarily bad, depending on its configuration. The  algorithm is based on a bad sorting algorithm, . At recursion level ,  merely uses a common sorting algorithm, such as bubblesort, to sort its inputs and return the sorted list. That is to say, . Therefore, badsort's time complexity is  if . Then,  calculates , and returns the first element of the sorted . , where  is Ackermann's function). The resulting algorithm has complexity , where  = factorial of  iterated  times. This algorithm can be made as inefficient as one wishes by picking a fast enough growing function .
Slowsort is a different humorous sorting algorithm that employs a misguided divide-and-conquer strategy to achieve massive complexity.
 is a hypothetical sorting algorithm based on bogosort, created as an in-joke among computer scientists. The algorithm generates a random permutation of its input using a quantum source of entropy, checks if the list is sorted, and, if it is not, destroys the universe. Assuming that the many-worlds interpretation holds, the use of this algorithm will result in at least one surviving universe where the input was successfully sorted in  time.
 is a sorting algorithm that checks if the array is sorted until a miracle occurs. It continually checks the array until it is sorted, never changing the order of the array. Particular care must be taken in the implementation of this algorithm as optimizing compilers may simply transform it into a while(true) loop.

See also
 Las Vegas algorithm
 Stooge sort

Notes

References

External links

 BogoSort on WikiWikiWeb
 Inefficient sort algorithms
 Bogosort: an implementation that runs on Unix-like systems, similar to the standard sort program.
 Bogosort and jmmcg::bogosort: Simple, yet perverse, C++ implementations of the bogosort algorithm.
 Bogosort NPM package: bogosort implementation for Node.js ecosystem.
 Max Sherman Bogo-sort is Sort of Slow, June 2013

Sorting algorithms
Comparison sorts
Computer humor
Articles with example Python (programming language) code